All Souls Chapel is a historic chapel at the Poland Spring Resort in Poland, Maine. It was built in 1912.  In 1977, it was added to the National Register of Historic Places.

The chapel was built in 1912 for use by the staff and guests of the Poland Spring Resort. It is now owned by the Poland Spring Preservation Society which also owns the Maine State Building (from the World's Columbian Exposition of 1893 in Chicago).

The chapel houses a series of hand-painted windows and an Ernest M. Skinner Opus 564 pipe organ. The chapel is currently used as a venue for weddings, baptisms and other services as well as plays and concerts.

Chapel history
In 1885, Julius Gassauer first started religious services for the employees of the dining room of the Poland Spring House. They were first held out of doors in the open air, but as it became necessary to find some shelter for these meetings in case of rain, the idea of a chapel was proposed. A fund was started by the contributions of the employees.

When meetings were transferred to the dining hall, some of the guests of the Houses began to attend. They were glad to add to the Chapel Fund, which grew to about twenty-five hundred dollars, before the effort was stopped for a season.  About this time some of the ladies of Poland Spring organized the first “Children’s Fair,” for the purpose of encouraging the children of the guests help make this possible.  The proceeds were at first given to a “Fresh Air Fund” for the benefit of the poor children of the cities. Later $5,000 was donated for what was known as the “Poland Spring Free Bed” at the Central Maine General Hospital in Lewiston.

Meanwhile, Miss Sadie Ricker had organized a Sunday School for the children of the surrounding country, and it was thought; “Why not aid this Sunday School?” Accordingly, this was done from the proceeds of the Children's Fairs, and after the school had been well established and well equipped, a small fund remained, the interest from which, with outside contributions, was used for several years for Christmas parties and summer outings.

Having worked on this worthy project in a substantial way, the ladies next agreed to work for a fund large enough to secure a chapel. They said; “Let us realize the dream of the earnest man who began the movement for a chapel here at Poland Spring, and the desire of the owners of this estate, who have expressed their readiness to contribute one-half the final cost of the edifice.” Inspired by this purpose, the ladies and families and guests at Poland Spring succeeded in raising approximately $15,000.

In September 1909, little Garrett A. Hobart III (the grandson of the first vice-president under McKinley), then only two years old, performed the important ceremony of breaking ground for the new chapel. For the next three years a large number of interested friends never ceased their efforts in behalf of the little church building.

This chapel was erected on the very top of the hill at the Poland Spring estate, overlooking the panorama of magnificent natural scenery. No expense was spared to make it of a quality commensurate with its environments and function.

Maine granite from the best quarries was procured for the walls and arches; quarter-sawn oak of the finest quality was used for the ceilings, doors, and other interior woodwork; brass for sills, reading desk, railings; and a floor of inlaid mosaic of beautiful and expensive design was made. The work of construction was performed by Italians brought here from Boston, and was done slowly and with great care, that no detail should lack in permanence or artistic value.
The large memorial window in the alcove at the front of the church is of stained glass illustrating the inscription which runs through it, “I am the Resurrection and the Life.” Through the bottom of the window are the words, “Glory be to the Father, and to the Son, and to the Holy Ghost.” The center section of the window contains the figure of Jesus and is resplendently beautiful in its coloring. This window was the gift of two lady visitors at Poland Spring, and was a very expensive contribution to the edifice.  The church was dedicated on September 1, 1912.

The following year the bells were installed in the tower. Known as the “Westminster Peals” or “Cambridge Quarters” they were a unit of four, keyed in G, C, D, and E, according to their weight of 1,500, 500, 400, and 300 pounds. They were composed of Lake Superior copper and imported tin, in the correct proportion to form the best ringing alloy.  On the largest of the bells is the following inscription: “Presented to All Souls Chapel, Poland Spring, Maine, by Mrs. Calvin Allen Richards and Miss Annie Louise Richards of Boston, Mass. June 1, 1913.”

Church services were held during the summer months (May through October) until 40 years ago. There were two Catholic services and one Protestant service each Sunday. The Catholic service was a mission of the Catholic Church at Yarmouth. The ministers serving here came from various towns, or may have been guests or visiting travelers. Services have been held in the winter months upon special occasion, as the building was kept heated all year, for protection to the interior furnishings and equipment.

This chapel has been the scene of countless weddings, as there is a great sentimental attachment here for thousands of persons who may have worked or vacationed at this resort.

The prayer at the official opening ceremony of this chapel in 1912 ended as follows: “We pray that this beautiful chapel may be a perpetual reminder of the reality of the spiritual life to many who are struggling upward toward the height where Thou dost dwell.”

See also
National Register of Historic Places listings in Androscoggin County, Maine

References

External links
 Poland Spring Preservation Society

Churches completed in 1912
20th-century churches in the United States
Properties of religious function on the National Register of Historic Places in Maine
Churches in Androscoggin County, Maine
1912 establishments in Maine
National Register of Historic Places in Androscoggin County, Maine
Historic district contributing properties in Maine